Gustawów may refer to the following places:
Gustawów, Łódź Voivodeship (central Poland)
Gustawów, Gmina Fałków in Świętokrzyskie Voivodeship (south-central Poland)
Gustawów, Gmina Stąporków in Świętokrzyskie Voivodeship (south-central Poland)
Gustawów, Lipsko County in Masovian Voivodeship (east-central Poland)
Gustawów, Radom County in Masovian Voivodeship (east-central Poland)
Gustawów, Greater Poland Voivodeship (west-central Poland)
Gustawów, Silesian Voivodeship (south Poland)